Miquin Woods Preserve is a park located in Glen Gardner, New Jersey.

Gallery 
Photos of Camp Watchung

References

Hunterdon County, New Jersey